The Saugatuck River Railroad Bridge, also known as Saugatuck River Bridge, is a railroad bridge carrying trackage of Metro-North Railroad's New Haven Line over the Saugatuck River in Westport, Connecticut. It is one of eight moveable bridges on the Amtrak Northeast Corridor route through Connecticut. It was built in 1905 for the New York, New Haven and Hartford Railroad.

The bridge design is a single leaf Scherzer rolling lift bascule bridge.

The bridge was surveyed in a multiple-property historic study in 1986.  The eight bridges from west to east are:  Mianus River Railroad Bridge at Cos Cob, built in 1904; Norwalk River Railroad Bridge at Norwalk, 1896; Saugatuck River Railroad Bridge at Westport, 1905; Pequonnock River Railroad Bridge at Bridgeport, 1902; Housatonic River Railroad Bridge, at Devon, 1905; Connecticut River Railroad Bridge, Old Saybrook-Old Lyme, 1907; Niantic River Bridge, East Lyme-Waterford, 1907; and Thames River Bridge, Groton, built in 1919.

See also
Saugatuck River Bridge, a road bridge which is also NRHP-listed
National Register of Historic Places listings in Fairfield County, Connecticut
List of bridges on the National Register of Historic Places in Connecticut

References

Amtrak bridges
Bascule bridges in the United States
Bridges completed in 1905
Bridges in Fairfield County, Connecticut
Metro-North Railroad
Railroad bridges on the National Register of Historic Places in Connecticut
Buildings and structures in Westport, Connecticut
Railroad bridges in Connecticut
New York, New Haven and Hartford Railroad bridges
Drawbridges on the National Register of Historic Places
National Register of Historic Places in Fairfield County, Connecticut
1905 establishments in Connecticut
Girder bridges in the United States